Umbukole is a small capital city in a northern state in Kurti county, Sudan. It is now mostly remembered as the name of a small district in Atbarah.

See also
 List of cities in Sudan

References

Populated places in Northern (state)